The velvet dogfish (Zameus squamulosus), the only member of the genus Zameus, is a small sleeper shark of the family Somniosidae, found around the world between latitudes 64°N and 48°S, from the surface to 2,000 m.

Description
Its length is up to 84 cm. Although sharks within the family Somniosidae have generally been accepted to be non-luminous, Zameus squamulosus has photophores on its ventral epidermis.

Reproduction
Its reproduction is ovoviviparous.

Conservation
In June 2018 the New Zealand Department of Conservation classified the velvet dogfish as "Data Deficient" with the qualifier "Uncertain whether Secure Overseas" under the New Zealand Threat Classification System.

References

velvet dogfish
Fauna of the Southeastern United States
Fish of the East Atlantic
Fish of the Dominican Republic
Fish of Uruguay
Fish of Venezuela
Marine fish of Eastern Australia
Marine fish of Western Australia
Marine fish of New Zealand
velvet dogfish
Taxa named by Albert Günther